Kate Fairweather (born 2 July 1975, in Subiaco, Western Australia) was an Australian Olympic archer. She was an Australian Institute of Sport scholarship holder.

Fairweather's older brother is archer Simon Fairweather.  Her father is Robert Fairweather, founder of the South Australian conservation charity Trees For Life. She won the Australian Junior Championships three times and was selected for the Sydney 2000 Olympic Games. Her results were creditable, coming 22 out of 64 in the individual event and 9 out of 12 in the team event.  She retired from archery after the 2000 Games.

She is married to Stephan Schmidt and has two children.  She undertook a PhD at the Australian National University.

References

External links
 ABC Sports profile
 Official Olympic Results
 Adelaide Brother and Sister top Olympic Archery Hope
 sports-reference

1975 births
Australian female archers
Living people
Olympic archers of Australia
Archers at the 2000 Summer Olympics
Sportspeople from Perth, Western Australia
Australian Institute of Sport archers
20th-century Australian women
21st-century Australian women